Arçan is the Lezgin village in the municipality of Quturğan in the Qusar Rayon of Azerbaijan.

References

Populated places in Qusar District